Central Union of Consumer Associations of Ukraine (Ukoopspilka) is a non-profit organization of Ukraine that serves as a representative and protects interests of consumer associations, societies and their members in respective state and international organizations. The Union is responsible for activities of cooperation movement members and development as well as promotion of cooperation ideas. The organization was initially created on June 7, 1920. Eventually it was integrated into the Centrosoyuz of the USSR and on June 17, 1992 it was reestablished once again.

See also
 Federation of Trade Unions of Ukraine
 List of co-operative federations

References

External links
 Official website
 List of European members of the International Co-operative Alliance

Organizations based in Kyiv
Organizations established in 1920
Cooperative federations
Cooperatives in Ukraine